Akhmedov is a surname that is derived from the male given name Akhmed and literally means Akhmed's. It is taken from the Soviet Union’s name changing policy. Notable people with the surname include:

Akhmedov 
 Bakhtiyar Akhmedov (born 1987), Russian wrestler
 Farkhad Akhmedov (born 1955), Azerbaijani businessman
 Kamalutdin Akhmedov (born 1986), Russian football player
 Magomed-Rasul Akhmedov (born 1966), Russian football player and coach

Akhmedova 
 Nuriya Akhmedova (1950–2015), Azerbaijani actress
 Umida Akhmedova (born 1955), Uzbekistani photojournalist

Surnames of Turkmenistan origin
Turkmen-language surnames
Azerbaijani-language surnames
Kazakh-language surnames
Kyrgyz-language surnames
Russian-language surnames
Tajik-language surnames
Uzbek-language surnames
Surnames of Kyrgyzstani origin
Surnames of Kazakhstani origin
Surnames of Uzbekistani origin
Surnames of Tajikistani origin
Surnames of Azerbaijani origin
Surnames of Russian origin